The 2017–18 Ascenso MX season is a two-part competition: Apertura 2017 and Clausura 2018. Ascenso MX is the second-tier football league of Mexico. Apertura began on 21 July 2017, and Clausura began on 5 January 2018.

Changes from the previous season
Six teams meet the requirements to be promoted to the Liga MX for the 2018–2019 season. Those teams are Atlético San Luis, Atlante, Celaya, Juárez, Sinaloa, and UdeG. The remaining teams were awarded MXN$120 million for winning the promotion playoff, which should be utilized to fulfill necessary requirements for promotion within the next season, and remain in Ascenso MX. If a team wins promotion but does not meet requirements for Liga MX, the relegated Liga MX team of the 2017–18 season will be obligated to pay the prize money to that team, and the relegated Liga MX team will remain in first division. If the relegated Liga MX team cannot distribute the prize money to the promoted Ascenso MX team, both teams will lose their right to play in Liga MX and must play in Ascenso MX the following season.

16 clubs participated in this season:
 Lobos BUAP were promoted to Liga MX.
 Chiapas was relegated from Liga MX; however, the club dissolved due to debts and will attempt to reform in the Segunda División.
 UdeC was relegated to the Segunda División.
 Tlaxcala were promoted from the Segunda División but will not compete this season due to a failure to meet stadium requirements. Their spot in Ascenso MX will be reserved for the 2018–19 season.
 Atlético San Luis returned after a one-year hiatus due to an investment by Atlético Madrid.
 Coras FC were sold and relocated to Morelos to become Club Atlético Zacatepec, replacing dissolved Zacatepec Siglo XXI.

Stadiums and Locations

Personnel and kits

1. On the back of shirt.
2. On the sleeves.
3. On the shorts.

Managerial changes

 Coras de Tepic was relocated and renamed Club Atlético Zacatepec. The board and management of Coras de Tepic took over the previous management of Zacatepec Siglo XXI.

Apertura 2017
The regular season began on 21 July 2017 and ended on 11 November 2017. Fixtures for the Apertura 2017 season were announced on 13 June 2017.
The ninth round of the season, scheduled for 22 and 23 September 2017, was suspended after the 2017 Central Mexico earthquake on 19 September 2017.
However, the ninth round was still the next round played, during the FIFA International break on 6,7, and 8 October 2017.
The liguilla was played from 15 November to 2 December 2017. Oaxaca won their first title after defeating Juárez on penalties.

Regular season

Standings

Positions by round

Results

Season statistics

Top goalscorers
Players sorted first by goals scored, then by last name.

Source: Ascenso MX

Hat-tricks

(H) – Home ; (A) – Away

Attendance

Per team

Highest and lowest

Source: Ascenso MX

Liguilla (Playoffs)
The eight best teams play two games against each other on a home-and-away basis. The higher seeded teams play on their home field during the second leg. The winner of each match up is determined by aggregate score. If the teams are tied, the away goals rule applies. In the quarterfinals and semifinals, if the two teams are tied on aggregate and away goals, the higher seeded team advances. In the final, if the two teams are tied after both legs, the match goes to extra time and, if necessary, a penalty shoot-out.

Quarterfinals

All times are UTC−6 except for matches in Ciudad Juárez.

First leg

Second leg

Semifinals
The first leg of the semifinals was played on 22 November 2017, and the second leg was played on 25 November 2017.

First leg

Second leg

Final

First leg

Second leg

Clausura 2018
The regular season began on 5 January 2018 and ended on 1 April 2018. The liguilla began on 7 April 2018 and ended on 29 April 2018. Alebrijes de Oaxaca are the defending champions, having won their first title. Cafetaleros de Tapachula defeated Leones Negros UdeG 3–2 on aggregate to win their first title.

Regular season

Standings

Positions by round 
The table lists the positions of teams after each week of matches. In order to preserve chronological evolvements, any postponed matches are not included in the round at which they were originally scheduled, but added to the full round they were played immediately afterwards. For example, if a match is scheduled for matchday 3, but then postponed and played between days 6 and 7, it will be added to the standings for day 6.

The eighth round was played on 13 and 14 February 2018. Due to a friendly between Atlético San Luis and New York City FC on 13 February 2018, the match between Zacatepec and Atlético San Luis was postponed until 20 February 2018, after the ninth round.

Results

Season statistics

Top goalscorers
Players sorted first by goals scored, then by last name.

Source: Ascenso MX

Hat-tricks

(H) – Home ; (A) – Away

Attendance

Per team

Highest and lowest

Source: Ascenso MX

Liguilla (Playoffs)

The eight best teams play two games against each other on a home-and-away basis. The higher seeded teams play on their home field during the second leg. The winner of each match up is determined by aggregate score. If the teams are tied, the away goals rule applies. In the quarterfinals and semifinals, if the two teams are tied on aggregate and away goals, the higher seeded team advances. In the final, if the two teams are tied after both legs, the match goes to extra time and, if necessary, a penalty shoot-out.

 Champion qualifies for the 2017–2018 Promotion Final.

Quarter-finals
The first legs were played on 7 and 8 April, and the second legs were played on 14 and 15 April 2018.

Notes

All times are UTC−6

First leg

Second leg

Semi-finals
The first legs were played on 18 and 19 April, and the second legs were played on 21 and 22 April 2018.

All times are UTC−6

First leg

Second leg

Final
The first leg was played on 26 April, and the second leg was played on 29 April 2018.

All times are UTC−6

First leg

Second leg

Promotion Final

The Promotion Final is a two-legged playoff between the winners of the Apertura and Clausura tournaments to determine which team will be promoted to Liga MX. The final would not be played if one team wins both the Apertura and Clausura tournaments, and they would be automatically promoted if they meet Liga MX requirements. The higher ranked team on the aggregate table, for the 2017–18 season, will play the second leg at home.

The Apertura 2017 champion was Oaxaca. The Clausura 2018 champion was Tapachula. Since the change in regulation for the 2017–18 season, neither team is certified to be promoted to Liga MX. The winner of the final can receive the prize money of MXN$120 million from the relegated Liga MX team, Lobos BUAP, but would not participate in the following Liga MX season. The 2018–19 Liga MX season would then be played with 17 teams. On 1 May 2018, the league announced there would be no changes to the relegation and promotion regulations agreed to before the beginning of the season. The league reiterated, on 4 May 2018, that the final would be played for a monetary prize and must be played by the participating teams who would otherwise risk their disaffiliation.

First Leg

Second Leg

Aggregate table
The Aggregate table is the general ranking for the 2017–18 season. This table is a sum of the Apertura and Clausura tournament standings. The aggregate table is used to determine seeding for the "Promotion" Final and for Apertura 2018 Copa MX qualification.

Relegation table
The relegated team will be the one with the lowest ratio of points to matches played in the following tournaments: Apertura 2015, Clausura 2016, Apertura 2016, Clausura 2017, Apertura 2017, and Clausura 2018.

Last update: 1 April 2018
 Rules for relegation: 1) Relegation coefficient; 2) Goal difference; 3) Number of goals scored; 4) Head-to-head results between tied teams; 5) Number of goals scored away; 6) Fair Play points
 R = Relegated
Source: Ascenso MX

Notes

See also 
2017–18 Liga MX season
2017–18 Liga MX Femenil season

References

External links
 Official website of Ascenso MX

Ascenso MX seasons
1